The Balta uezd was one of the uezds (uyezds or subdivisions) of the Podolian Governorate of the Russian Empire. It was situated in the southeastern part of the governorate. Its administrative centre was Balta.

Demographics
At the time of the Russian Empire Census of 1897, Baltsky Uyezd had a population of 391,018. Of these, 76.9% spoke Ukrainian, 13.6% Yiddish, 4.5% Moldovan or Romanian, 3.9% Russian, 0.9% Polish, 0.1% German, 0.1% Romani, 0.1% Tatar and 0.1% Czech as their native language.

References

 
Uezds of Podolia Governorate